Susanne Bartsch (born 1951) is a Swiss event producer living in the United States whose monthly parties at the Copacabana in the late 1980s united the haute and demi-monde, and made her an icon of New York nightlife. "Ms. Bartsch's name," according to The New York Times, is "the night life equivalent of a couture label, thanks to the numerous extravaganzas she staged in cities from Montreal to Miami."

Life and career 
Born in Switzerland, Bartsch left her family in 1979 at the age of 17 and moved to London, where she became an intimate of such celebrities as Jimmy Page and Malcolm McLaren. After moving to New York City in 1981, she opened a clothing boutique in SoHo that gave exposure to new British designers and labels, including Vivienne Westwood, Leigh Bowery, BodyMap, John Galliano, and milliner Stephen Jones. She also helped launch the careers of young American designers Alpana Bawa and Michael Leva, and was a precursor and influence upon the Club Kids.

By the late 1980s, the economy was slowing, and edgy clothing was becoming harder to sell. Bartsch began organizing weekly parties at prominent New York nightclubs, such as Savage, Bentley's, and, finally, the Copacabana. Bartsch created the Love Ball in 1989, which raised $400,000 to fight AIDS. For the first time, elements of Harlem ball culture were introduced to a national audience.

Bartsch took part in philanthropic work, running annual holiday toy drives along with her partner David Barton, whom she married in 1995. The couple had a son Bailey Bartsch Barton, and separated in late 2010.

In 2015, The Museum at FIT mounted an exhibit celebrating Bartsch's costumes.

Filmography 
 Susanne Bartsch: On Top (2017)
 RuPaul's Drag Race All Stars (2019; season 4, Guest judge)

References

External links 
 "Susanne Bartsch & Dr. Valerie Steele in Conversation" from Archive on Demand
 Article 2018 (German)

1950s births
Living people
American socialites
Swiss emigrants to the United States
Swiss expatriates in England
Year of birth missing (living people)